Mitrephora wangii is a species of plant in the family Annonaceae. It is native to China and Thailand.

Description
It is a tree reaching 10 meters in height. Its young branches are densely covered in hairs. Its leathery, oblong to lance-shaped leaves are 10.5-27 by 3.5-8 centimeters. The leaves have tips that taper to a point and wedge-shaped bases. The leaves are hairless on their upper surfaces and sparsely covered in hair underneath. The leaves have 10-14 pairs of secondary veins emanating from their midribs. Its petioles are 6.5-11.5 millimeters and sparsely covered in hairs. Its inflorescences are organized as unbranched rachides. Each flower is born on a pedicel that is 1.2-1.7 centimeters long. Bracts on the pedicels are 1.5-2 by 1-1.5 millimeters. Its oval sepals are 3-3.5 by 3-4.5 millimeters. Its flowers have 6 petals in two rows of three. The yellow, oval outer petals are 1.6-2.3 by 1-1.9 centimeters with somewhat wavy margins when mature. The purplish inner petals are 1.1-1.9 by 0.6-1.3 centimeters. Its flowers have numerous yellow, hairless stamen that are 0.8-1 millimeter. Its flowers have up to 8-10 carpels that are 1.8-2 millimeters. The carpels have 6-8 ovules. Its oblong fruit are 2.4-3.8 by 1.4-2.6 centimeters. The fruit are sparsely covered in hair. The fruit are born on 0.9-1.3 centimeter stipes. The stipes are attached to 1-1.6 centimeter pedicels. The seeds are 9 by 6 millimeters.

Reproductive biology
The pollen of M. wangii is shed as permanent tetrads.

References

Flora of China
wangii
Vulnerable plants
Taxonomy articles created by Polbot
Taxa named by Hu Xiansu